Barbara Romer, born 1970 in Bielefeld, is a German film producer, a former management consultant at McKinsey & Company and a former manager at Soho House.  Romer is the founder of the New Globe Theater, an organization that proposed building a contemporary Shakespearean Globe. Norman Foster was the proposed project's architect.

Romer graduated from Princeton University in 1993 and received a Ph.D. from Cambridge University in 1998.

Filmography 
 Days and Nights (2013): Producer

References

External links
 
New Globe website
 

Princeton University alumni
German film producers
Living people
1970 births
Mass media people from Bielefeld
Film people from North Rhine-Westphalia